Fort Augustus Pier was a railway station in Inverness-shire, Scotland, and served as the north terminus of the Invergarry and Fort Augustus Railway between 1903 and 1906.

Overview 
The station was opened in 1903 as the north terminus of the line, situated outside of Fort Augustus, located on the banks of Loch Ness. The station cost a total of £348 to build.

A run round loop was included at this station to allow locomotives to run around to make a return journey. The station building featured a general waiting room, but no public conveniences.

The station was closed on 30 September 1906 due to poor traffic, and the station was dismantled when the track was lifted. Nothing of the station survives today.

References

External links
 Sub Brit Page 

Disused railway stations in Highland (council area)
Former North British Railway stations
Railway stations in Great Britain opened in 1903
Railway stations in Great Britain closed in 1906